Heart of Dixie is a 1989 drama film adaptation of the 1976 novel Heartbreak Hotel by Anne Rivers Siddons and directed by Martin Davidson.  The film stars Ally Sheedy, Virginia Madsen, Phoebe Cates, and Treat Williams.

Plot
Three sorority women at a 1957 Alabama college face the experience and difficulties of ethnic strife and integration.

Production notes
The expression "Heart of Dixie" is a nickname for the state of Alabama.

The fictional Randolph University is based on Auburn University in Alabama.

The movie was filmed in Oxford, Mississippi at the University of Mississippi, and in Holly Springs, Mississippi.

The soda shop featured in the film was a renovated gas station that became the original McAlister's Deli Restaurant.

Cast
 Ally Sheedy as Maggie DeLoach 
 Virginia Madsen as Delia June Curry
 Phoebe Cates as Aiken Reed
 Treat Williams as Hoyt Cunningham
 Don Michael Paul as 'Boots' Claibourne
 Kyle Secor as Charles Payton 'Tuck' Tucker
 Francesca P. Roberts as Keefi
 Peter Berg as Jenks
 Jenny Robertson as Sister
 Lisa Zane as M.A.
 Ashley Gardner as Jean
 Eddy Kiihnl as Mitchell
 Richard Bradford as Judge Claibourne
 Barbara Babcock as Coralee Claibourne
 Hazen Gifford as Dean Howard
 Michael St. Gerard as Elvis

Reception

Noted film critic Vincent Canby of The New York Times wrote:

Heart of Dixie is a clear-eyed, funny and affecting movie about the emotional awakening of a pretty, white Alabama coed in 1957, on the eve of the great racial struggles that would mark the 1960s throughout the South. ...  Mr. McCown's screenplay, based on the novel Heartbreak Hotel, by Anne Rivers Siddons, is refreshing in the way that it refuses to impose a long historical view on the immediate events it is recording. The movie is always aware of history, but it somehow avoids the awful self-assurance that comes with 20-20 hindsight. ...  Miss Sheedy is so good as Maggie that the character's liberation, and the rise of her social consciousness, appear to be genuine triumphs. Miss Madsen, who looks a little like Carole Landis as well as like Kim Novak, is also fine, as are Mr. Williams, Phoebe Cates (as Maggie's unconventional friend) and Don Michael Paul, who manages to play Maggie's Southern chauvinist fiance with a good deal of arrogant charm.

In contrast, Rita Kempley, staff writer at The Washington Post panned the film, writing, "Ally Sheedy, Virginia Madsen and Phoebe Cates combine their negligible talents in Heart of Dixie -- a melodrama so full of hams, it oinks. Led by Sheedy, the tedious trio plays giddy coeds caught up in the racist and sexist traditions of the South in the late '50s. They all sound like they've been gulping hush puppy batter ... Working from McCown's histrionic screenplay, Martin Davidson of Eddie and the Cruisers proves once again that he don't know nothing 'bout directing no movies."

Ally Sheedy was nominated for Worst Actress at the Golden Raspberry Awards, but lost to Heather Locklear for The Return of Swamp Thing.

References

External links
 
 
 
 Heart of Dixie film trailer at YouTube

1989 films
1989 drama films
American drama films
1980s English-language films
Films about fraternities and sororities
Films based on American novels
Films directed by Martin Davidson
Films set in 1957
Films set in Alabama
Films set in universities and colleges
Films shot in Mississippi
Orion Pictures films
1980s American films